Farragut may refer to:

People
 David Farragut (1801–1870), American admiral
 George Farragut (1755–1817), American Revolutionary War naval officer, father of David Farragut
 Ken Farragut (1928-2014), American National Football League player
 Faraj ben Salim, also known as Farragut of Girgenti, 13th century Sicilian-Jewish physician and translator
 Pilar Fuertes Ferragut (1962–2012), Spanish diplomat

Places
Farragut, Iowa, a city
Farragut, Tennessee, a town
Farragut, Brooklyn, a neighborhood
Farragut Square in Washington, D.C.
Farragut North station in Washington, D.C.
Farragut State Park, Idaho
Farragut Naval Training Station, Bayview, Idaho, a former US Navy training center
Farragut Wildlife Management Area, Idaho

Ships
 Farragut-class destroyer (disambiguation)
 
 
 , various United States Navy ships

Schools
Farragut Career Academy, a public high school in Chicago, Illinois
Farragut High School, Farragut, Tennessee
David Glasgow Farragut High School, Naval Station Rota, Spain

See also
 Ferragut
 Ferragus (disambiguation)
 Farragus (disambiguation)